Goza, Pakistan, or Gozo, is a village in Dadu District, Sindh province, Pakistan at 
Goza (clan), a clan of the Chakma people
, woven mat similar to tatami
, Japanese place name and family name come from nobleman's seat
Dial-Goza House, an American 1880s-era historic house in Florida
Sara Goza, American pediatrician

Villages in Sindh
Dadu District